The 2009–10 Liga de Honra season (also known as Liga Vitalis due to sponsorship reasons) is the 20th season of the second-tier football in Portugal. It began on 13 August 2009 and will end on 9 May 2010. Olhanense are the defending champions.

Teams
Trofense were relegated to the Liga de Honra after finishing 16th and last in the Portuguese Liga 2008–09 season. Trofense were to be accompanied by Belenenses, who finished in 15th place. Belenenses were ending a ten-year stretch in the Portuguese top-level league, while Trofense returned to the Liga da Honra after just one year in the top flight.

However, Estrela de Amadora, who finished in 11th place, were instead relegated to the Liga Vitalis for economic problems. The club was eventually relegated to the Second Division, the third-tier of Portuguese football due to the same problems, alongside Vizela, who had finished 10th last season but were relegated due to the Apito Dourado scandal.

Due to those relegations, Boavista and Gondomar, the 15th and 16th teams, respectively, should have remained in the Liga de Honra but both were still relegated due to economic difficulties for Boavista and involvement in the Apito Dourado case for Gondomar. To make up for the loss of four teams (instead of the regular two), Penafiel and Carregado, losers of the previous year's Second Division promotion play-offs, were invited to the Liga de Honra.

Stadia and locations

League table

Results

Top goalscorers

Updated to games played on 2 May 2010Source: Liga Vitalis – Match Statistics

References

External links
Official webpage 
Official regulation 
Official Statistics 

Liga Portugal 2 seasons
Port
2009–10 in Portuguese football leagues